Uttar Pradesh, a state in north India has a long association with Jainism. Today the state is home to a number of Jain monuments, such as Jain Temples and Jain Tirths. There are around 213,267 Jains in Uttar Pradesh according to 2011 Census of India.

History
Parshvanatha, the twenty-third tirthankara, was born in Benaras (now Varanasi) in 872 BCE. According to Jain tradition, Kashi (now Varanasi) is the birthplace of three more tithankaras, namely Suparshvanatha, Chandraprabha and Shreyansanatha.

According to Jain tradition, five tirthankaras were born at Ayodhya, including Rishabhanatha, Ajitanatha, Abhinandananatha, Sumatinatha and Anantanatha.

The famous naked male torso found at Lohanipur, whether Mauryan or, more likely Kushana, is generally taken as indicative evidence of ascetic tradition in north India. Inscriptions from the many ayagapatas of the Mathura region make clear that puja to the tirthankaras with lay and ascetic involvement was an important dimension to this.

The earliest archeological evidence is in the form of a naked headless torso discovered in 1937 near Patna (Bihar), which is called the Lohanipur Torso. This has been dated by modern scholarship to about 2nd-century BCE. It is a highly polished stone artwork of precise human form, but it is unclear if it belongs to Jainism, Ajivikas or some other Indian religious ascetic tradition. While it is not Buddhist, and is naked like the Jinas, it may also not be a Jain statue because it lacks the Jain iconography, and because similar high quality Jain artworks are missing for many centuries and Jain artworks that have been found from the same period in north India show quite different forms and symbols. It may belong to Ajivikas or another ancient Indian naked ascetic tradition. Ancient naked terracotta statues discovered in 1970s near Ayodhya are similar to the Lohanipur Torso, but terracotta arts are also missing in Jaina tradition and the Ayodhya terracotta statues too lack Jain iconography.

Bundelkhand

It is one of the few regions in India where Jainism has a strong presence and influence. There are many ancient tirthas in Bundelkhand. Many of the modern scholars of Jainism are from this region.

Deogarh

The fort temples are dominated by the Jain temples in the eastern part of the hill fort; the images here are mostly of the "iconographic and the stylistic variety". The Jain complex was built during 8th to the 17th century  and consist of 31 Jain temples housing around 2,000 sculptures which is the largest such collection in the world. The Jain temples have a large number of panels depicting scenes from Jain philosophy, tirthankara images and votive tablets. The pillars are carved with a thousand figures. Worship at some of the Jain temples are still held regularly. The most famous of the Jain temples in the fort is the Shantinath temple, which was built before 862 AD. It is testament that a prosperous Jain community lived in this region. Jain temple complex in Deogarh is protected by the Department of Archaeology of the Archaeological Survey of India (ASI). ASI maintain an archaeological museum at the Deogarh site, which is noted for its treasured archaeological sculptures.

Kankali Tila 

Kankali Tila is a mound located at Mathura. The name of the mound is derived from a modern temple of Hindu goddess Kankali. The famous Jain stupa was excavated here in 1890-91 by Alois Anton Führer (Dr. Führer). The archaeological findings testifies the existence of two Jain temples and stupas. Numerous Jain sculptures, Ayagapattas (tablet of homage).

Most sculptures could be dated from the 2nd century BC to the 12th century CE, thus representing a continuous period of about 14 centuries during which Jainism flourished at Mathura. These sculptures are now housed in the Lucknow State Museum and in the Mathura Museum. The excavations of Kankali Tila are regarded as a testimony great antiquity of Jainism.

Prominent Tirthas

 Shantinath Temple in Deogarh
 Prachin Bada Mandir, Hastinapur, Meerut
 Navagarh Tirth
 Kailash Parvat Rachna, Hastinapur, Meerut
 Ashtapad temple, Hastinapur, Meerut
 Jambu Dweep Rachana, Hastinapur, Meerut
 Ahi Kshetra
 Vahelna Jain temple
 Trilok Teerth Dham, Bada Gaon in Baghpat
 Parshvanath Jain temple in Varanasi
 Sarnath Jain Tirth at Sarnath, Varanasi
 Shobhnath temple, Shravasti
 Shri Shouripur Digambar Jain Siddha Kshetra, Bateshwar
 Shri Vimalnath Digambar Jain Atishay Kshetra  in Kampil, Farrukhabad district
 Shree Parsvnath Atishey Kshetra Digamber Jain mandir, Bada Gaon in Baghpat
 Shri Chintamani Parshwnath Jain Shwetambar Mandir, Haridwar
 Khukhundoo

Photo gallery

See also

Notes

References
 
 
 
 
 

Jain communities
History of Uttar Pradesh
Jainism in Uttar Pradesh